The Autism Science Foundation (ASF) is a non-profit organization that funds evidence-based autism research and supports autism families. The organization was founded in April 2009 by Alison Tepper Singer, a former senior executive of Autism Speaks and the longest-serving public member of the Interagency Autism Coordinating Committee (IACC), and Karen Margulis London, co-founder of the National Alliance for Autism Research. Both Singer and London are parents of autistic children.

Formation 
The Autism Science Foundation was created as a split from Autism Speaks, which assigned a high priority to investigating the debunked claim that vaccination is associated with autism risk. This focus raised concerns among parents and researchers.

Alison Singer, a senior executive of Autism Speaks, resigned in January 2009 rather than vote for committing money to new research studies into vaccination and autism. The U.S. Interagency Autism Coordinating Committee (IACC), of which Singer was a member, voted against committing the research funds; this was contrary to the Autism Speaks policy on vaccine safety research. Singer said:

 "There isn't an unlimited pot of money, and every dollar spent looking where we know the answer isn't is one less dollar we have to spend where we might find new answers. The fact is that vaccines save lives; they don't cause autism."

Singer noted that numerous scientific studies already disproved the link first suggested more than a decade ago and that Autism Speaks needs to "move on." Later that year, along with NAAR's cofounder Karen London, Singer launched ASF as a nonprofit organization supporting autism research premised on the principles that autism has a strong genetic component, that vaccines do not cause autism, and that early diagnosis and intervention are critical.

Eric London resigned from Autism Speaks' Scientific Affairs Committee in June 2009, saying that arguments that "there might be rare cases of 'biologically plausible' vaccine involvement ... are misleading and disingenuous", and that Autism Speaks was "adversely impacting" autism research. London is a founding member of the ASF's Scientific Advisory Board.

On January 5, 2011, Brian Deer published the first part of his British Medical Journal series on Andrew Wakefield's "elaborate fraud" which started the dubious MMR vaccine controversy. On January 7, 2011, Alison Singer was interviewed by Kiran Chetry on CNN's American Morning. Singer discussed the repercussions of Deer's report, stating, "...we can finally put the question of autism and vaccines behind us."

Activities 

Since 2014, ASF has hosted annual Days of Learning, TED-style science conferences that bring top researchers together with autism stakeholders to share cutting-edge research findings and to discuss the issues that matter most to autism families. 

ASF offers numerous funding opportunities for scientists, and has been nationally recognized for its support of early career researchers. The organization currently offers pre- and postdoctoral fellowships, two-year post undergraduate fellowships, medical school gap year fellowships, and undergraduate summer research awards. 

ASF has been a sponsor of the "International Society for Autism Research" (INSAR) since 2009, and has interviewed numerous researchers at the event.

In 2019, Alison Singer, the president of the ASF, announced that she had joined the National Council on Severe Autism.

In 2020, ASF partnered with Els for Autism to form Sam's Sibs Stick Together, which aims to offer extra support for autism siblings, present findings of research that focus on siblings and discuss resources available for siblings of all ages.

Funding 

Vaccinologist Dr. Paul Offit, a founding board member of the Autism Science Foundation, donates all royalties from his book Deadly Choices to the ASF. The Autism Science Foundation also receives royalties from paperback sales of Dr. Offit's previous book, Autism's False Prophets.

ASF is also the recipient of funds raised through Wall Street Rides FAR, the annual cycling and walking event that originated in White Plains and has since expanded to include satellite rides in Baltimore and Toronto.

Awards 

GuideStar named the Autism Science Foundation a top nonprofit startup in disabilities category in 2011, calling it "a shining star to those interested in real science and evidence based interventions". 

In 2021, ASF earned top-rated status from GreatNonProfits for the ninth consecutive year.

Scientific advisory board 
The Autism Science Foundation has 17 scientific advisory board members, including Ami Klin and Harold S. Koplewicz.

See also 
 List of autism-related topics

References

External links 
 
 Autism's fight for facts: A voice for science, Nature Magazine

Autism-related organizations in the United States
Non-profit organizations based in New York City
Organizations established in 2009
Medical and health foundations in the United States
Mental health organizations in New York (state)
2009 establishments in New York City